Gex Williams (born August 22, 1952) is an American politician from Kentucky. He is a member of the Republican Party and has represented District 20 in the Kentucky Senate since January 1, 2023. Williams's experience includes working as an internet and IT consultant. He resides in Verona, Kentucky. From 1991 to 1992 Williams represented Kentucky House District 60. In 1993, he served in the Kentucky Senate, representing District 24 until 1998.

References 

1952 births
21st-century American politicians
Living people
Republican Party Kentucky state senators
Republican Party members of the Kentucky House of Representatives
University of Florida alumni
People from Boone County, Kentucky